Pseudischnocampa is a genus of moths in the family Erebidae. The genus was described by Rothschild in 1935.

Species
 Pseudischnocampa diluta Toulgoët, 1986
 Pseudischnocampa ecuadorensis Rothschild, 1933
 Pseudischnocampa humosa (Dognin, 1893)
 Pseudischnocampa nigridorsata Schaus, 1901
 Pseudischnocampa nigrivena Schaus, 1901
 Pseudischnocampa triphylia (Druce, 1896)

References

Phaegopterina
Moth genera